The Journal of Addictions Nursing is a peer-reviewed nursing journal which publishes original articles on current research, issues, practices and innovations in the field of addictions, with focus on addictions nursing. It is the official journal of the International Nurses Society on Addictions.

The journal is edited by Christine Vourakis (California State University, Sacramento, California, US). It has been published since 1989 and according to Journal Citation Reports it has a 2016 impact factor of 0.400. The journal is published quarterly.

References 

Lippincott Williams & Wilkins academic journals
Quarterly journals
Publications established in 1989
English-language journals
Psychiatric and mental health nursing journals
Addiction medicine journals